Ellen Ruth Reed née Renfroe (born April 25, 1992) is an American, former collegiate All-American, right-handed softball pitcher originally from Jackson, Tennessee.

Playing career
Renfroe played for the Tennessee Lady Volunteers from 2011 to 2014. Following her freshman season she was named SEC Freshman of the Year. Renfroe was the second of three softball playing sisters at Tennessee; she is the sister of Anna and Ivy Renfroe. Renfroe was also an All-Southeastern Conference player for four years. Renfroe was also on the 2013 Women's College World Series All-Tournament team, helping the Lady Vols finish as National runner up in the 2013 Women's College World Series. Renfroe is currently a high school softball coach.

Personal
Ellen spent two years as an assistant coach for the University of Memphis. She also spent one year as the head coach of Bethel University in 2017. She was an assistant coach of the University of Louisiana at Lafayette, working primarily with the pitching staff.

Career Statistics

References

External links
 

1992 births
Living people
Tennessee Volunteers softball players
People from Jackson, Tennessee
Softball players from Tennessee